The Best of Magic was a British magic show produced by Thames Television for the ITV network that aired from 13 September 1989 to 19 September 1990. The show was hosted by Geoffrey Durham, Simon Mayo, and Anthea Turner, with frequent guest appearances by Arturo Brachetti and Max Maven.

List of episodes

References

External links
 

1989 British television series debuts
1990 British television series endings
Television series by Fremantle (company)
Television shows produced by Thames Television
British television magic series
English-language television shows